Eden's Crush was an American girl group who were created on the American television series Popstars which aired on the now defunct WB. The group was formed in late 2000 and released the hit song "Get Over Yourself" in 2001, following the finale of the show. The group consisted of Ana Maria Lombo, Ivette Sosa, Maile Misajon, Nicole Scherzinger and Rosanna Tavarez.

Career
Hundreds of girls competed to become pop stars in late 2000 on the TV series Popstars, produced by David Foster. The group was narrowed down to five finalists, Ivette Sosa, Maile Misajon, Ana Maria Lombo, Nicole Scherzinger and Rosanna Tavarez, over several prime time episodes. Warner Bros./Sire Records signed the group to a recording contract before the band was named or had finalized its membership, due to the hours of network television exposure the group would receive.

The group's debut single, "Get Over Yourself" topped the Canadian Singles Chart and peaked at number 8 on the Billboard Hot 100. "Love This Way" was later released as a promotional single. Their album Popstars was certified gold, and peaked at number 6 on the Billboard 200 albums chart. The group guest starred as themselves on an episode of the television show Sabrina, the Teenage Witch. In 2001, they played as a support act on some dates for *NSYNC's Pop Odyssey Tour and Jessica Simpson's DreamChaser Tour. In the beginning of 2002, their record company, London-Sire Records, folded and the group disbanded.

Scherzinger would later have more success with The Pussycat Dolls.

Discography

Studio albums

Singles

Promotional singles

Concert tours
Opening act
PopOdyssey  (2001)
DreamChaser Tour  (2001)

References

American pop girl groups
American pop music groups
Hispanic and Latino American women singers
Musical quartets
Musical groups established in 2000
Musical groups disestablished in 2002
Musical groups from California
Nicole Scherzinger
Popstars winners
Teen pop groups
Vocal quintets